USS Guardian (AGR/YAGR-1) was a , converted from a Liberty Ship, acquired by the US Navy in 1954. Her task was to act as part of the radar defenses of the United States in the Cold War, serving until 1965.

Construction

Guardian (YAGR-1) was laid down on 20 March  1945, under a Maritime Commission (MARCOM) contract, MC hull 3137, as the Liberty Ship James G. Squires, by J.A. Jones Construction, Panama City, Florida. She was launched 8 May 1945; sponsored by Mrs. Elisa Broome; and delivered 31 May, to Waterman Steamship Corporation.

Service history 
She served until 5 October 1945, when she was placed in the National Defense Reserve Fleet, James River, Virginia.

Acquired by the US Navy, she was taken out of reserve in 1954, she was converted to a radar picket ship at the Charleston Navy Yard, Charleston, South Carolina, and commissioned Guardian (YAGR-1), at Norfolk, Virginia, 1 February 1955.

The first ocean radar station ship put into service by the Navy, Guardian conducted shakedown in Roosevelt Roads, Puerto Rico, and surrounding waters, reporting to Newport, Rhode Island, her home port, 2 June 1955. In 1958 the Atlantic Ocean radar picket force relocated to Davisville, Rhode Island.

Equipped with highly sensitive radar gear to enable her to detect, track, and report any aircraft penetrating the continental United States, Guardian was attached to the Eastern Continental Air Defense Command. She and her sister ships spent 3 or 4 weeks at a time off the US East Coast and West Coast on radar picket duty, even in the heaviest winter weather in the North Atlantic Ocean.

In addition to radar picket duty, Guardian participated in ASW exercises with both American and Canadian naval units and in local operations out of Newport and Key West, Florida. Her designation was changed to AGR-1 on 28 September 1958.

Decommissioning 

Guardian was decommissioned 28 July 1965. She was returned to the Maritime Commission (MARCOM) for lay up in the National Defense Reserve Fleet. She was sold for scrapping, 23 November 1970, and withdrawn from fleet, 21 December 1970. She was scrapped in Bilbao, Spain, September 1971.

Military awards and honors 

Guardians crew was eligible for the following medals:

 Navy Expeditionary Medal (2 awards)
 National Defense Service Medal

References

Bibliography

External links 
 

 

Liberty ships
Ships built in Panama City, Florida
1945 ships
World War II merchant ships of the United States
Guardian-class radar picket ships
Cold War auxiliary ships of the United States
James River Reserve Fleet